Youba is a given name. Notable people with the name include:

Youba Diarra (born 1998), Malian footballer
Youba Hmeida (born 1976), Mauritanian sprinter
Youba Sambou (born 1944), Senegalese politician
Youba Sissokho (born 1991), Senegalese-born Spanish boxer

See also
Yuba (disambiguation)